Leslie Chan is an advocate for open access. He is a professor at University of Toronto Scarborough.

Biography
Chan was born in Hong Kong in 1959. When he was 16 he moved to Canada to attend university. He received a degree in anthropology. While working to have his research published, he began to perceive problems with academic publishing and began exploring options to fix them.

Work
Chan supports the open access movement.

Chan was a signatory to the Budapest Open Access Initiative.

Bioline International

In 1993 Chan founded Bioline International. Bioline International is a not-for-profit scholarly publishing cooperative which seeks to share open access journals published in developing countries. Chan believes that developing countries need access to journals.

References

External links

1959 births
Living people
Open access activists
Academic staff of the University of Toronto
Hong Kong emigrants to Canada